The Pawnee Municipal Swimming Pool and Bathhouse were erected by the Federal Emergency Relief Administration (FERA) and the Works Progress Administration (WPA) in the 1930s. The swimming pool, built in 1937, covers three acres.  The Bathhouse was constructed in 1939 of native stone. The west side of the bathhouse is one-story and is typical of WPA-built buildings in the state, while the east side is two-story and more elaborate.

See also
National Register of Historic Places listings in Pawnee County, Oklahoma

References

Buildings and structures on the National Register of Historic Places in Oklahoma
Buildings and structures completed in 1937
Buildings and structures in Pawnee County, Oklahoma
National Register of Historic Places in Pawnee County, Oklahoma
Works Progress Administration in Oklahoma